Bellingham is a surname. Notable people with the surname include:

Edward Bellingham (died 1549), Lord Deputy of Ireland
Sir Edward Bellingham, 5th Baronet, Irish politician and soldier
Henry, Lord Bellingham (born 1955), English politician
Sir Henry Bellingham, 1st Baronet (died 1650), English politician
Sir Henry Bellingham, 4th Baronet, British barrister-at-law
James Bellingham (footballer), Scottish footballer
Jobe Bellingham (born 2005), English footballer
John Bellingham (c. 1769 – 1812), assassin of British Prime Minister Spencer Perceval
Jude Bellingham (born 2003), English footballer
Kate Bellingham, British engineer and former television presenter
Lynda Bellingham (born 1948) Canadian-born English actress
Norman Bellingham (born 1964), American canoeist and Olympic champion
Phillip Bellingham (born 1991), Australian cross-country skier
Rebecca Bellingham (born 1978), New Zealand badminton player
Richard Bellingham (1592–1672), colonial magistrate, lawyer, and governor of the Massachusetts Bay Colony
Sydney Robert Bellingham (1808–1900), Irish-born Canadian businessman
Sir William Bellingham, 1st Baronet, after whom Bellingham Bay is named
Elizabeth, Lady Echlin, née Bellingham, (c. 1704 – 1782), English writer
Fictional characters:
Morag Bellingham, fictional character in Home & Away

English-language surnames
English toponymic surnames
Surnames of English origin